SOMOS Films LLC is a Miami based company that produces feature films in Spanish for theatrical, television, internet and other distribution means. SOMOS Films is part of the SOMOS Group(SOMOSTV, SOMOS Productions, SOMOS Distribution, SOMOS Next and SOMOS Films). SOMOS Films produces its own projects and participates in co-production with international partnering companies. In its coproduction projects the company works with local talent at creative, technical and artistic levels.

History 
In 2018, Somos Films produced its first film Muerte en Berruecos, a movie about the assassination of South America's independence hero Antonio Jose de Sucre, together with Digivision Producciones, premiered in Venezuela in the month of April. Muerte en Berruecos was nominated to the Goya Awards for Best Ibero-American Film at the 35th edition.  In 2019, The company produced Voy Por Ti, which depicts bullying in schools, co-produced with Cnac, Xenon Films and Zona Filmica, which premiered at the Miami International Film Festival. and winner of Special Jury Award at the Festival del Cinema Latino Americano di Trieste.

The company has completed the production of Especial (starred by Ruper Vásquez and Greyber Rengifo), a story about a child with Down Syndrome, in co-production with El Dorado Films and Divarte Cine and El Paraiso de La Serpiente, with Biznaga Films, Cine Provincia, Bibi Film and La Maroma Producciones (Mexico). Both films are participating in international film festivals. Especial won  the award "Best Fiction Film" at The Venezuelan Film Festival in July, 2021. and also the Silver Hugo award in the New Directors category in the Chicago International Film Festival.

In 2021, SOMOS Films finished the production of Hotel Providencia, filmed in Margarita Island, together with 58 Films, Sghettisawz and Digivisión Producciones, as well as the Venezuelan production with Divarte Producciones Un Cupido sin puntería (starred by Luis Geronimo Abreu and Claudia La Gatta) and "One Way" (filmed in Caracas) starred by Maria Alejandra Martin, with Rodando Films C.A. The company also produced "El Quinceanero de mi abuela" (starred by Mónica Pastrana, Johanna Rosaly, Linette Torres and Jorge Luis Ramos) y "Al Reves" (with Angelique Burgos and Obie Bermúdez) en la isla de Puerto Rico in co-production with Pinolywood Studios. Currently SOMOS Films and Rodando Films are producing the comedy "Amor en el Aire"'' in Colombia.

Productions

References

External links 
 Official website

Companies based in Miami
Film production companies of the United States
2018 establishments in Florida